Jean Audureau (1932–2001) was a French writer and playwright known for the whimsey of his work.

Life and career
Jean Audureau was born in Cholet, France. He wrote his first play La Réception in 1956, and began his career in earnest in 1966 with À Memphis il y a un homme d’une force prodigieuse. He continued his success with Le Jeune Homme (1970), La Lève (1975) and Félicité (1983). More contemporary plays include Katherine Barker (1993), À l’image d’Hélène (1996) and L’Élégant Profil d’une Bugatti sous la lune (2002). Andureau was noted for the quality of his composition.

Audureau died in Paris in 2001.

Works
Details on selected works include:
Le Jeune Homme, directed by Dominique Quéhec, Théâtre National de Chaillot
À Memphis il y a un homme d’une force prodigieuse, directed by Henri Ronse, Comédie-Française au Théâtre National de l'Odéon
Félicité, directed by Jean-Pierre Vincent, world premiere at the Comédie-Française
Katherine Barker, directed by de Jean-Louis Thamin, Théâtre des Abbesses

References

1932 births
2001 deaths
People from Cholet
20th-century French dramatists and playwrights
20th-century French male writers
21st-century French non-fiction writers